Paulsen's Independent Battery was an artillery battery from Ohio that served in the Union Army between September 2, 1862, and September 22, 1862, during the American Civil War.

Service 
The battery was organized at Columbus, Ohio and mustered in on September 2, 1862, for a one-month service. Twenty-days later it was mustered out on September 22,  1862 by Brevet Major George McGown from the U.S. Army.

References

Bibliography 
 Dyer, Frederick H. (1959). A Compendium of the War of the Rebellion. New York and London. Thomas Yoseloff, Publisher. .
 Keifer, Joseph Warren. (2004). Civil War Regiments from Ohio. eBookOnDisk.com Pensacola, Florida. .

Units and formations of the Union Army from Ohio
1862 establishments in Ohio
Artillery units and formations of the American Civil War
Military units and formations established in 1862
Military units and formations disestablished in 1862